Stefano da Ferrara was an Italian painter from Ferrara who active in the latter half of the 15th century.

Biography
The dates of his birth and death are uncertain. He is described by Vasari as having been the friend of Mantegna. He filled the chapel of the Santo at Padua with frescoes, which were destroyed in 1500 during the renovation of the building by Andrea Briosco. In the Pinacoteca di Brera are two Madonnas with Saints that are assigned to him;  in San Giovanni in Monte in Bologna is a Madonna and Child, with two Angels considered to be by this artist. he worked on the frescoes in the Palazzo della Ragione, Padua.

Recent studies have identified Stefano Di Benedetto as Stefano da Ferrara.  In these studies the art historian Miklós Boskovits has plausibly attributed the frescos of casa Minerbi - Del Sale to Stefano di Benedetto da Ferrara (not to be confused with his Quattrocento homonym).

Footnotes

References
 
 Miklós Boskovits, Per Stefano da Ferrara, pittore trecentesco, in Hommage à Michel Laclotte: études sur la peinture du Moyen Age et de la Renaissance, Milano - Electa ; Paris - Réunion des Musées Nationaux, pp. 56–67, 1994, 
Anne Dunlop, Painted Palace. The rice of secular art in early Renaissance Italy, The Pennsylvania State University Press, 2009, pp. 91–109.

External links

 Anne Dunlop, Allegory, Painting, and Petrarch in Word & Image: A Journal of Verbal/Visual Enquiry, 2008

Year of birth unknown
Year of death unknown
14th-century Italian painters
Italian male painters
Trecento painters
Painters from Ferrara